Acacia nodiflora is a shrub belonging to the genus Acacia and the subgenus Phyllodineae that is endemic to western Australia.

Description
The phyllodes occur in clusters of up seven. It blooms from August to September and produces yellow flowers. The simple inflorescences occur singly or in groups of up to three per axil. The spherical to obloid flower-heads globular contain 25 to 55 golden flowers.

Distribution
It is native to a small area in the Wheatbelt region of Western Australia where it is found on rocky hills and granite ranges growing on rocky loam or clay soils. The bulk of the population is found around Carnamah and Morawa where it is found on rocky hills.

See also
List of Acacia species

References

nodiflora
Acacias of Western Australia
Plants described in 1855
Taxa named by George Bentham